In Greek mythology, Automedusa (Ancient Greek:  or ) was a Megarian princess as the daughter of King Alcathous either by his first wife, Pyrgo or second spouse, Evaechme, daughter of King Megareus of Megara. Thus, she was the sister of Ischepolis, Callipolis, Iphinoe and Periboea. Automedusa married Heracles's half-brother Iphicles and had by him a son Iolaus, who became the charioteer of Heracles.

Notes

References 

 Apollodorus, The Library with an English Translation by Sir James George Frazer, F.B.A., F.R.S. in 2 Volumes, Cambridge, MA, Harvard University Press; London, William Heinemann Ltd. 1921. . Online version at the Perseus Digital Library. Greek text available from the same website.
Pausanias, Description of Greece with an English Translation by W.H.S. Jones, Litt.D., and H.A. Ormerod, M.A., in 4 Volumes. Cambridge, MA, Harvard University Press; London, William Heinemann Ltd. 1918. . Online version at the Perseus Digital Library
 Pausanias, Graeciae Descriptio. 3 vols. Leipzig, Teubner. 1903.  Greek text available at the Perseus Digital Library.

Princesses in Greek mythology
Megarian characters in Greek mythology